Rose Garnett (born 1970) is the director of BBC Film, the feature film-making arm of the BBC. Garnett has a producing credit on 26 productions.

Biography 

Garnett was born in 1970 to Andy Garnett and Polly Devlin, a writer for Vogue from County Tyrone.

After graduating from the University of Cambridge, Garnett's first job in 1993 was as the producer of Talking Tongues Theatre Company with David Farr, Rachel Weisz and Sasha Hails. She and Farr then took over the Gate Theatre in Notting Hill where they commissioned and worked with many writers and directors including Lee Hall, Tracy Letts, Dominic Cook and Sarah Kane. Garnett has worked as a script editor and producer, with her credits including Darren Aronofsky's Black Swan (Associate Producer) and Katrina Boorman's Me And Me Dad (Executive Producer). 

Garnett joined the BBC in 2017 from Film4 where she was Head of Creative. Whilst there, Rose developed and executive produced an array of recent successful UK films including Lenny Abrahamson's Room, Andrea Arnold's American Honey and Martin McDonagh's Three Billboards. Rose began her time at Film4 as Head of Development in 2014 before being promoted to Head of Editorial in 2014 and finally Head of Creative in 2015.

References

External links

Irish documentary film directors
1970 births
Living people
Alumni of the University of Cambridge
People from County Tyrone
BBC people